The meat price refers to the price of meat.

Inexpensive meats
Inexpensive meat or cheap meat include e.g. fatty cuts of lamb or mutton.

Factors influencing the price of meat
Factors influencing the price of meat include supply and demand, subsidies, hidden costs, taxes, quotas or non-material costs ("moral cost") of meat production. Non-material costs can be related to issues such as animal welfare (e.g. treatment of animals, over-breeding). Hidden costs of meat production can be related to the environmental impact of meat production and to the effect on human health (such as resistant antibiotics). Critics of the meat industry often point to these aspects as a problem.

See also
Livestock price
Intensive animal farming
Organic agriculture
Local food
Factory farming divestment
Food vs. feed
Fodder
Wagyu
Slow food
Draft animal: multi-role animals
Meat analogue
Meat-free days

Bibliography
 Lymbery, Philip. Farmageddon: The True Cost of Cheap Meat, Bloomsbury Publishing, 2014.

Further reading
 Should meat be a luxury food ?
 Understanding Markets for Grass-Fed Beef: Consumer Taste, Price, and Purchase Preferences
 Eat less meat, of better quality: don’t do it with sadness. Do it with joy!
 Rethinking agriculture report

References

Meat industry